Gordon Armytage Fairbairn (26 June 1892 – 5 November 1973) was an Australian first-class cricketer active 1912–24 who played for Middlesex. He was born in Logan Downs; died in Ocean Grove.

References

1892 births
1973 deaths
Australian cricketers
Middlesex cricketers
Cambridge University cricketers
Free Foresters cricketers